Joseph Myles Blong  (September 17, 1853 – September 17, 1892) was an American professional baseball player who played pitcher and outfield from 1875 to 1877. He attended the University of Notre Dame in the 1860s. He was kicked out of baseball in 1877 for "crooked play".

External links

1853 births
1892 deaths
19th-century baseball players
Major League Baseball outfielders
Major League Baseball pitchers
St. Louis Red Stockings players
St. Louis Brown Stockings players
Springfield (minor league baseball) players
Davenport Brown Stockings players
Baseball players from St. Louis